Stay with You may refer to:

Songs
"Stay with You" (Goo Goo Dolls song), 2006
"Stay with You" (Lemon Jelly song), 2004
"Stay with You", song by John Legend from Get Lifted
"Stay with You", song by Cade and Cheat Codes
"Stay with You", song by Russell Morris from A Thousand Suns
"Stay with You", song by Mike Posner and Avicii

See also

I'll Stay with You (film), a 1931 German romantic comedy film directed by Johannes Meyer

 
Stay with Me (disambiguation)